Dušan Švantner is a member of Slovak National Party. He was a member of the National Council of the Slovak Republic from 1994 to 1998 and from 1998 to 2002. He was born in Brezno and still lives there.

References

Year of birth missing (living people)
Living people
People from Brezno
Slovak National Party politicians
Members of the National Council (Slovakia) 1994-1998
Members of the National Council (Slovakia) 1998-2002